Music By Idiots is Captain Everything!'s first full-length album. Currently out-of-print, the band made the album available on their website for full download in 2004.

Track listing
Another Song About Girls
imreallyscared
All my Clothes are Brown
Matt vs. the Company
Cigarettes
1 Minute Love Song
Hey! What Happened?
Fly in my Soup
Over You
B.D.A.
Song in eh?
False Smile
Letting Go
All the Same
That is so Lame
Wet Kisser
Punk Rock Ditty
Fallin' Over
Gastroenteritis
Road Movie
Friday night, 3 o'clock
Dream a little dream

References

1998 albums
Captain Everything! albums